Shree Jagannatha Temple is a major place of worship in Thalassery, Kannur District, Kerala province, India.

Location
The temple is located near Jagannath Temple Gate Railway Station, about one kilometre from Thalassery city (Directions).

History

The temple was erected by Shri Narayana Guru in 1908.  A statue of the guru was included in the temple complex in 1927. The Guru had a glimpse of his own statue at Colombo where it arrived on the way from Italy to India.it is a famous Temple.

The Temple
The temple is made in the style of Jagannath Temple, Puri, Odisha.  The idol is made of Panchaloha by famous sculptor Thavarali.

Image Gallery

References

External links

Hindu temples in Kannur district
Temples dedicated to Jagannath
Narayana Guru